I Am What I Am is a studio album that includes the first recordings by Milan (with the exception of two early singles). The front cover (pictured) also includes "presenting a bright new star". The album was produced by Budd Granoff.

Although Milan recorded many additional songs on later singles, this was the only album ever released in his name. This album (and its associated singles) is also notable for apparently being the only time in his career that Milan used the "Rodell" surname.

Songwriter credits

Milan is listed as the songwriter on all tracks under the name "M. Rodell"; on the first 45, the songwriter's name is Milan Rodelle (which is presumably a misspelling). As verified in the liner notes, the album is unusual for pop music albums of the times in this regard. There are three music publishing companies listed for the songs on the album:  Jonathan Glenn Music, Nom Music and Pine Knob Music.

Release data
The album was released in the LP format on 20th Century Fox in 1964 in both monaural and stereophonic editions (catalogue numbers TFM 3149 and TFS 4149, respectively). The first and last songs on Side 1 were released as the first single on the same record label (catalogue number 478), also in 1964. The second single from the album was "Runnin' Wild" b/w "Angel's Lullaby".

Track listing 
All tracks written by Milan (M. Rodell).

Side one
 I Am What I Am – 2:22
 Two of a Kind – 2:24
 Angel's Lullaby – 2:45
 There's Nothing without You – 2:32
 Dream Girl – 2:25
 Over and Over Again – 2:15

Side two
 Runnin' Wild – 2:20
 Going My Way – 1:56
 Spellbound – 2:15
 Today Is My Day – 2:20
 This Little Girl – 2:25
 The Big Lie – 2:09

References

1964 debut albums
Milan the Leather Boy albums
Garage rock albums by American artists
20th Century Fox Records albums